is a railway station in the town of Miharu, Tamura District, Fukushima Prefecture, Japan, operated by East Japan Railway Company (JR East).

Lines

Station layout
The station has a single island platform connected to the station building by an underground passage. The station has a Midori no Madoguchi staffed ticket office.

Platforms

History
Miharu Station opened on July 21, 1914. The station was absorbed into the JR East network upon the privatization of the Japanese National Railways (JNR) on April 1, 1987.

Passenger statistics
In fiscal 2018, the station was used by an average of 870 passengers daily (boarding passengers only).

Surrounding area
 Miharu Town Hall
 Miharu Post Office

See also
 List of Railway Stations in Japan

References

External links

  

Stations of East Japan Railway Company
Railway stations in Fukushima Prefecture
Ban'etsu East Line
Railway stations in Japan opened in 1914
Miharu, Fukushima